Romain Padovani (born 15 October 1989) is a French professional footballer who plays as a defensive midfielder.

Career

Monaco and trials
Born in Nice, Padovani began his career on FC Villefranche's youth system, and joined Monaco in 2001. He then left the club in the following season, finishing his formation with Cavigal Nice Sports. In 2008, he returned to Monaco, after a brief period with Rapid Menton (only playing friendlies). He was assigned with the club's B-side, in CFA. On 6 January 2009, he appeared on the bench in a first-team friendly against Juventus. In June 2010, Padovani signed a one-year professional deal with Monaco, which was renewed a year later.

He was released at the end of 2011–12 season, without featuring with the first team. However, after failed trials with Nantes, Laval and CA Bastia, he returned to Monaco II with an amateur contract. He then was a regular starter at the reserve side for 2012–13. In April 2013, Padovani went on a trial at Leyton Orient. He trained with the club for a week, but nothing came of it.

Portsmouth
Late in the month, Padovani went on a trial at Portsmouth, after Sebastien Ewen (Yassin Moutaouakil's agent) indicated the player to Pompey. On 9 May, he signed a two-year deal with the club, with Niort also providing competition for his signature.

Padovani made his Portsmouth debut on 9 July 2013, in a pre-season friendly against Havant & Waterlooville; he also scored the fourth of a 5–0 win. In his following game, against Bognor Regis Town, he scored the second of 4–2 win.

Padovani made his league debut in a 4–1 home defeat to Oxford United on 3 August 2013. He scored his first goal in English football on 26 December, scoring the only goal in a 1–0 home win over Dagenham & Redbridge, through a 45th-minute header. On 23 June of the following year, Padovani was released from Pompey by mutual consent.

Championnat National spells
A day after being released by Portsmouth, Padovani joined Fréjus Saint-Raphaël in a two-year deal. After just one season he moved on the Les Herbiers and then the following season to Chambly. He stayed at Chambly for four seasons, including one in Ligue 2 after promotion from the 2018–19 Championnat National.

In July 2020 he joined US Quevilly-Rouen.

Career statistics

References

External links

1989 births
Living people
Footballers from Nice
French footballers
Association football midfielders
AS Monaco FC players
French expatriate footballers
French expatriate sportspeople in England
Portsmouth F.C. players
ÉFC Fréjus Saint-Raphaël players
Les Herbiers VF players
FC Chambly Oise players
US Quevilly-Rouen Métropole players
Championnat National players
Ligue 2 players
Expatriate footballers in England
English Football League players